Upright Magic is a 1975 Soviet family film directed by Yuri Pobedonostsev.

Plot 
The film tells about a girl named Marina, who was careless about any activity, saying: "And so it goes". And mother answered her that this was the name of the evil sorceress.

Cast 
 I. Fominskaya
 Yuri Minin
 Elena Sanaeva
 Makhmud Esambayev
 Tamara Sovchi

References

External links 
 

1975 films
1970s Russian-language films
Soviet children's films
Films based on fairy tales